Planet in Focus International Environmental Film Festival (PIF) is an incorporated not-for-prot film festival and registered charitable organization, based in Toronto, Ontario, Canada.

History 
Planet in Focus International Environmental Film Festival (PIF) is an incorporated not-for-profit film festival and registered charitable organization, founded in 1999, by Mark Haslam. 

PIF is currently run by a volunteer Board of Directors and a small staff including Executive Director, Katherine Bruce, Programs Director, Alessandra Cannito, Programmers Julian Carrington and Leslely Johnson, and Pre-Screeners, Ron Ma, Hui Wang, Gesila Azorbo, Michael John Long, and Gabielle Aguilar. 

Planet in Focus operates year-round to produce the annual film festival in October, as well as programs such as Green School Tours and Eco-Film Labs.

PIF grants yearly Eco-Hero Awards, and patrons include David Suzuki, Vandana Shiva, Rob Stewart, Melina Laboucan-Massimo, Autumn Peltier, Ron Finley, Col. Chris Hadfield, Jennifer Baichwal, Margaret Atwood, Edward Burtynsky, and James Balog, among others.

Award Winners 
Best Canadian Short Film - The Pipe Dreams Project directed by Faros Des Roches and Ryan Vandecasteyen
Best Canadian Short Film Honourable Mention - Spokedirected by Lulu Wei
Best Canadian Feature Film - Occupy Love directed by Velcrow Ripper and produced by Ian Mackenzie and Nova Ami
Best Canadian Feature Film Honourable Mention - Lost Rivers directed by Caroline Bacle and produced by Katarina Soukoup
Best International Short Film - HOT & BOTHERED (UK) directed by Giannina Lasalvia
Best International Feature Film - Heart of Sky, Heart of Earth directed by Frauke Sandig and Eric Black
The Mark Haslam Award - Rainforest: The Limit of Splendourdirected by Richard Boyce
The Mark Haslam Award Honourable Mention - Just Do It! directed by Emily James
The Green Pitch Award - Honey For Sale directed by Amanda Strong
The Green Screen Award sponsored by Astral's Harold Greenberg Fund - Warehouse 13, Honorable Mention, In Organic We Trust directed by Kiplin Pastor2011

Award Winners 
Best Canadian Short Film - Nanameskueu (Tremblement de terre) directed by Réal Junior Leblanc
Best Canadian Feature Film - Waking the Green Tiger directed by Gary Marcuse
Best International Short Film - Carbon for Water directed by Evan Abramson and Carmen Elsa Lopez Abramson
Best International Feature Film - There Once was an Island: Te Henua e Nnoho directed by Briar March
The Mark Haslam Award - Keepers of the Water directed by Ayelen Liberona
The Green Pitch Award - Carpe Diem directed by Charlotte Engel
The Green Screen Award sponsored by Astral's Harold Greenberg Fund - Score: A Hockey Musical directed by Avi Federgreen, Honorable Mention, Powerful: Energy for Everyone directed by David Chernushenko
Canadian Eco-Hero - Kevin McMahon
International Eco-Hero - Ric O'Barry

Toronto Premieres 
Urban Roots directed by Mark MacInnis
On Coal River directed by Francine Cavanaugh and Adams Wood
La Reine Malade (The Ailing Queen) directed by Pascal Sanchez
Waseya Dizihin directed by Kevin Papatie
White Water, Black Gold directed by David Lavallee
The Clean Bin Project directed by Grant Baldwin
L'Homme de glace (Ice Philosophy) directed by Melanie Carrier and Olivier Higgins
There Once was an Island: Te Henua e Nnoho directed by Briar March
Darwin directed by Nick Brandestini
Solartaxi: Around the World With the Sun directed by Erik Schmitt
Waking the Green Tiger directed by Gary Marcuse
Spoil directed by Trip Jennings and Andy Maser

Canadian Premieres 
Revenge of the Electric Car (Opening Night Gala Presentation) directed by Chris Paine
The Whale (Closing Night Gala Presentation) directed by Suzanne Chisholm
Future of Hope directed by Henry Bateman
Happy People: A Year in the Taiga" directed by Werner Herzog
Silent Snow: The Invisible Poisoning of the World directed by Jan van den Berg and Pipaluk Knudsen-Ostermann
Der Tag des Spatzen (Day of the Sparrow) directed by Philip Scheffner
Enjoy Your Meal!:How Food Changes the World directed by Walter Grotenhuis
L'Or des autres (The Gold of Others) directed by Simon Plouffe
Powerful: Energy for Everyone directed by David Chernushenko
Leonids Geschichte (Leonids Story) directed by Rainer Ludwigs
Second Nature: The Biomimicry Evolution directed by Guy Lieberman
The Polar Explorer directed by Mark Terry
Last Stand on the Island directed by Evan Abramson and Carmen Elsa Lopez Abramson
To Reveal the Fourteen Windows directed by Christina Battle
Cowboys in India directed by Simon Chambers
Le White (White Houses) directed by Simona Risi

North American Premieres 
Up in Smoke directed by Adam Wakeling

World Premieres 
Portrait of Resistance: The Art & Activism of Carole Conde and Karl Beveridge directed by Roz Owen
The Past as Future directed by Ton van Zantvoort
From Chernobyl to Fukushima: A Campaigner's Journey directed by Aube Giroux
Brick by Brick: The Story of the Evergreen Brickworks directed by Catherine Annau
Niger River: A River Under Siege directed by Bernice Notenboom
Carbon for Water directed by Evan Abramson and Carmen Elsa Lopez Abramson
On the Line directed by Frank Wolf

Toronto Premieres
Blue Gold: World Water Wars directed by Sam Bozzo
Peace with Seals directed by Miroslav Novak
Boreal Forest Expedition directed by Nick and Lindsay Bradford-Ewart
Northland: Long Journey directed by Edie Steiner
Chasing Wild Horses directed by Matt Trecartin and John Wesley Chisholm
Howser in Peril directed by Tom Prior
Death in the Forest directed by Gordon McLennan
Being Innu directed by Catherine Mullins
Waste = Food directed by Rob Van Hattum
Addicted to Plastic directed by Ian Connacher
Umbrella (film) directed by Du Haibin
Birth of the Smoked Meat directed by Jeanne Pope and Zoe Mapp
Tableland directed by Craig Noble
Papiroflexia directed by Jaoquin Baldwin
The Poet of Grappa directed by Stefano Scarafia
Flowers of Rwanda directed by David Muñoz
Intestines of the Earth directed by Barbier Olivier
Gimmie Green directed by Isaac Brown and Eric Flagg
Mama Coco: The Sacred Leaf directed by Felix Atencio-Gonzales
Rallco, a Bad Business directed by Nicholas Garcia and Xavier Vasqué
Pick me Up directed by Andrea Bussman
Gates of the Arctic directed by Rory Banyard

Canadian Premieres 
Our Wonderful Nature directed by Tomer Eshed
Michael Schmidt: Organic Hero or Bioterrorist directed by Norman Lofts
Heron Pond: A Boardwalk View directed by Cade Bursell
Eviction directed by Terra Schnoor
Terra Sacer directed by Alberto Guevara, Elysee Nouvet
A Massacre Foretold directed by Nick Higgins
The Beggars in Addis Arabia directed by Jakob Gottschau
Paradise- Three Journeys in this World directed by Elina Hirvonen
The Sacred Food directed by Jack Pettibone Riccobono
My Inventions directed by Robert Holbrook
Global Food: Once Upon a French Fry directed by Pierre-Olivier François
Land of Writers directed by Silvio Ciuccetti
Slow Food directed by Vanja Ohna
Greina directed by Villi Hermann
On Relations directed by Jorge Acebo
Roaming Around directed by Brigette Bertele
Fighting Goliath- Texas Coal Wars directed by Mat Hames
Charcoal Traffic directed by Nathan Collett
Scarred Lands and Wounded Lives: The Environmental Impact of War directed by Alice and Lincoln Day
Where Do They Go? directed by Julianne Becker
The Right to Survive- Turtle Conservation and Fisheries Livelihoods directed by Rita Banerji, Shilpi Sharma
The Squid Daddy’s Labour Room directed by Ke Chin Yuan
Today the Hawk Takes One Chick directed by Jane Gillooly
We Belong to this Country directed by Alison Leonard
One of the Last directed by Paul Zinder
Fate of the Lhapa directed by Sarah Sifers
Sounds of the Seas directed by Volker Barth
The Last Nomads directed by Andrew Gregg
Eternal Mash directed by Catherine van Campen
Journey of a Red Fridge directed by Lucian and Natasa Muntean
Strange Homeland directed by Jens Schanze
Boomrang directed by Daryoush Gharibzadeh
One Water (documentary) directed by Ali Habashi and Sanjeev Chatterjee
Justice Now directed by Martin O’Brien, Robbie Proctor
Alethea directed by Petra Holzer, Ethem Ozguven
Crossed Wires directed by Elida Schogt
The Green Dragon directed by Caroline Harrison
Digital Cemeteries directed by Yorgos Avgeropoulos
Crabs on the Road directed by Gabriela Dominguez
Atlantis Approaching directed by Elizabeth Pollock
This Much I Know directed by Bridget Hanna
A Moment of Clarity directed by Sarah Cowhey, Louise Davidson
If Man Could Fly directed by Yael Kipper Zaretzky
Ma’rib directed by Rainer Komers
Farms Without Farmers directed by Jessica Weisberg, Benjamin Thorp Brown
The Hunger Season directed by Beadie Finzi
Are There Still Any Shepherds directed by Jorge Pelicano

North American Premieres
Begging for Change directed by Dave Jones
Alchemy directed by Eva Bakkeslett
Showdown at the Top of the World directed by Yorgos Avgeropoulos
Welcome Aboard Toxic Airlines directed by Tristan Loraine
49 Words for Snow directed by Yorgos Avgeropoulos

World Premieres 
Driven By Vision directed by Michael McNamara
The Falldown directed by Ben Graeme
Tales of a Yellow Bike directed by Tina Hahn
Soldiers of Peace directed by Timothy Wise
Breadmakers directed by Yasmin Fedda
Return to Nepal directed by Robert Lang
Thirst directed by Gail Maurice

See also 
List of environmental film festivals

References

Environmental film festivals
Film festivals in Toronto
1999 establishments in Ontario